The discography of Social Distortion, a Southern California-based punk rock band formed in 1978 by vocalist/guitarist and founder Mike Ness, contains seven studio albums, one extended play (EP), two compilation albums, two DVDs and twenty-four singles.

After releasing a handful of singles between 1980 and 1982, Social Distortion released their first studio album in 1983, titled Mommy's Little Monster. Five years elapsed before Social Distortion's next major release, Prison Bound. While the band still failed to break into the mainstream success at the time of its release, critical praise given to Prison Bound garnered attention from major labels, including Epic Records, with whom Social Distortion would eventually sign in 1989.

In 1990, they released their third album, which is self-titled, with the singles "Let It Be Me", "Ball and Chain", "Ring of Fire", "Sick Boy" and "Story of My Life" bringing the band exposure on the United States charts. This album was followed by 1992's Somewhere Between Heaven and Hell, which debuted at number 76 on the Billboard 200 and featured the band's highest charting single "Bad Luck", which reached number 2 on the Modern Rock Tracks chart. Four years elapsed before Social Distortion's next studio album, White Light, White Heat, White Trash, which peaked at #27 on the Billboard 200 in 1996, the band's highest chart position to date, and featured their only Billboard Hot 100 single "I Was Wrong". In 1997, Social Distortion terminated their contract with Epic and decided to stay on TimeBomb Recordings, who reissued their first two albums and released the Mainliner compilation two years earlier.

After the release of the White Light, White Heat, White Trash album, Social Distortion took another hiatus and Ness pursued a solo career and released two albums (Cheating at Solitaire and Under the Influences) in 1999. Tragedy struck on February 29, 2000 when their longtime guitarist Dennis Danell died from an apparent brain anyuerism. After debating whether to break up, or to move on with a new guitarist, Ness decided to hire a new guitarist, Jonny "2 Bags" Wickersham, who would stay with the band permanently. Also during that time, a new drummer, Charlie Quintana, was hired. From 2001 to 2004, the band had been touring semi-frequently, playing sold-out shows in the Los Angeles, California area and other cities. In September 2004, Social Distortion issued their long-awaited sixth album Sex, Love and Rock 'n' Roll, which was their second album to peak in the top 40 of the Billboard 200, at number 31. The album's lead single, "Reach for the Sky", became another one of Social Distortion's biggest hits in the fall of 2004. Prior to the release of that album, longtime bassist John Maurer, who had remained with the band for 20 years, decided to leave Social Distortion and Rancid's Matt Freeman replaced him on tour for a few months and then the band hired their current bassist Brent Harding. Social Distortion released their seventh studio album, Hard Times and Nursery Rhymes, on January 18, 2011.

During the bands set at Hellfest 2022, Ness commented on stage that the band was set to enter the studio in September of 2022 to start recording. The band then played a new song off the aforementioned forthcoming album.

Albums

Studio albums

Live albums

Compilation albums

Extended plays

Songs

Singles

Videography

Video albums

Music videos

Notes

A.  "I Was Wrong" peaked at #54 on the US Radio Songs chart.

References

Punk rock group discographies
Discography
Discographies of American artists